An extreme wind warning (SAME code EWW) is an alert issued by the National Weather Service for areas that will experience sustained surface winds 100 knots (115 mph, 185 km/h, 51 m/s) or greater within one hour, due to a landfalling hurricane.  Extreme wind warnings are intended to provide guidance to the general public at a county or sub-county level when such winds pose a significant threat of casualties. Their issuance is intended to cover as precise of an area as possible and can be issued no earlier than two hours before the onset of extreme winds. The extreme wind warning should not be confused with tornado warnings, which covers rotating supercells from severe storms, and high wind warnings, which is similar, but used for non-severe/tornadic winds of 40 mph to 114 mph, mainly on land (particularly the Great Plains and West Coast regions).

The motivation to create a short-fused warning for extreme winds began after Hurricane Charley and Hurricane Jeanne struck Florida in 2004. During the passage of Charley across the state, strong winds prompted the National Weather Service weather forecast office in Melbourne, Florida to issue a special bulletin advising immediate action due to the onset of life-threatening winds by embedding the bulletin within a tornado warning, thus giving the bulletin higher visibility and urgency. The office's forecasters issued the ad hoc product after determining that the active hurricane warnings did not sufficiently convey the severity and imminency of Charley's eyewall over central Florida. The forecast office also issued similar "tornado" warnings as the strong winds of Jeanne moved ashore from the east later that year. The nonconventional usage of tornado warnings for extreme hurricane winds was praised by emergency management, citing it as an ingenious method of protecting lives. In December 2004, the Melbourne forecast office briefed attendees at an annual NOAA Hurricane Conference on their use of the special tornado warning, advocating and eventually reaching consensus for a specialized official National Weather Service product for extreme winds. 

The new warning was standardized in its experimental stages in 2005, so weather forecast offices continued to use special tornado warnings to broadcast the threat of severe wind during the landfalls of Hurricanes Dennis, Katrina, Rita, and Wilma. The wind and temporal thresholds that eventually became a part of extreme wind warnings were also used as thresholds for these special tornado warnings in 2005. The warnings, termed Extreme Tropical Cyclone Destructive Wind Warnings, advised residents to take sturdy shelter in the interior portions of well-built structures. During Katrina, the weather services serving the Jackson and New Orleans and Baton Rouge, Louisiana issued 19 warnings. Public response to these warnings was mixed, praising their specificity but finding their placement within tornado warnings confusing, particularly when they were issued near traditional tornado warnings. The advice of taking interior low-level shelter given in the wind warnings also contradicted the advice given in Hurricane Local Statements of taking interior shelter in elevated floors for storm surge-prone areas. NOAA/NWS recommendations called for the development of an extreme wind warning independent from tornado warnings and increased outreach for the warning.

The following year, extreme wind warnings continued to be packaged within special tornado warnings for public evaluation, and the warning became its own official independent product by the 2007 Atlantic hurricane season, though no hurricane would trigger an extreme wind warning for nearly another decade. Despite the newly independent warning system, until the 2015 Atlantic hurricane season, the Emergency Alert System continued to broadcast EWWs as tornado warnings (using the TOR event code). On the morning of October 7, 2016, the nearby passage of Category 3 Hurricane Matthew just off of Cape Canaveral prompted the first issuance of an extreme wind warning.

Issuances

See also
Severe weather terminology (United States)

References

Weather warnings and advisories